Dražen Pernar (born 9 September 1971) is a retired Croatian football defender.

He played almost his entire career for Cibalia Vinkovci and later became sports director of the club. In 2022 he was sports director at neighboring club Vukovar.

References

1971 births
Living people
Sportspeople from Vinkovci
Association football defenders
Croatian footballers
HNK Cibalia players
Croatian Football League players
First Football League (Croatia) players